Mounir Madoui (born August 18, 1979) is an Algerian footballer who played for ES Sétif and CS Constantine. Madoui is the younger brother of Kheïreddine Madoui, who also played for ES Sétif.

References

External links
 

1979 births
Algerian footballers
Algerian Ligue Professionnelle 1 players
CS Constantine players
ES Sétif players
Living people
Footballers from Sétif
Association football defenders
21st-century Algerian people